Jay Sommers (January 3, 1917September 25, 1985) was an American producer, director and comedy writer whose career spanned four decades. He wrote more than 90 television comedy episodes, produced 63, and was creator and producer of the Green Acres television show. He also wrote for and executive produced Petticoat Junction during its second and third seasons,  and also worked for The Adventures of Ozzie and Harriet.

Early years
Sommers studied chemistry at City College of New York before becoming a comedy writer.

Career
In 1940, he got a break by being brought in to write for a Milton Berle radio show. (Berle at the time was one of the most popular radio personalities.) He wrote for The Alan Young Show, Eddie Cantor, Spike Jones, and Red Skelton on the radio, and for the radio comedy series Lum and Abner.

In 1950, he was the producer, writer and director for the Granby's Green Acres radio show. Although it only ran for two months, it was very similar to the highly successful Green Acres television show that he created 15 years later, on which he served as main producer and writer.

His first television work was in 1955, as a writer for The Great Gildersleeve. He wrote three episodes of Hello, Larry toward the end of his life. He is credited for the story and screenplay for the movie Gordy, released 10 years after his death.

Pilot
Sommers produced, created and co-wrote Pioneer Spirit, a pilot that was broadcast on NBC television July 21, 1969.

Recognition
In 1984, the USC School of Cinematic Arts honored Sommers by giving a retrospective of Green Acres.

Death
Sommers died of heart disease September 25, 1985, at Cedars-Sinai Medical Center in Los Angeles, California. He was survived by his wife, five sons and a grandson.

References

 Brennan, Sandra. Allmovie

External links
 

1917 births
1985 deaths
American television producers
American television writers
American male television writers
20th-century American businesspeople
20th-century American screenwriters
20th-century American male writers